Alvin Sargent (April 12, 1927 – May 9, 2019) was an American screenwriter. He won two Academy Awards for Best Adapted Screenplay, for Julia (1977), and Ordinary People (1980). Sargent's other prominent works include screenplays of the films The Sterile Cuckoo (1969), The Effect of Gamma Rays on Man-in-the-Moon Marigolds (1970), Paper Moon (1973), Nuts (1987), White Palace (1990), What About Bob? (1991), Unfaithful (2002), Spider-Man 2 (2004), Spider-Man 3 (2007), and The Amazing Spider-Man (2012).

Biography
Alvin Sargent was born Alvin Supowitz in Philadelphia, Pennsylvania, the son of Esther (née Kadansky) and Isaac Supowitz. He was of Russian Jewish descent. Sargent attended Upper Darby High School, leaving aged 17 to join the Navy. As of 2006, he was one of 35 alumni to be on the school's Wall of Fame.

Sargent began writing for television in 1953 and through the 1960s he scripted episodes for Route 66, Ben Casey and The Alfred Hitchcock Hour. He collaborated on his first screenplay for a film on Gambit (1966) and gained recognition for I Walk the Line (1970) and Paper Moon (1973) for which he won the WGA Award for Best Screenplay Based on Material from Another Medium and was nominated for an Academy Award. He won the Academy Award for Adapted Screenplay in 1978 for the film Julia (1977) and again in 1981 for Ordinary People (1980). He collaborated on the 2004 screenplay for Spider-Man 2 and the 2007 screenplay for Spider-Man 3. He'd also collaborate on the screenplay for the 2012 reboot The Amazing Spider-Man.

He had a longtime relationship with producer Laura Ziskin; they were married from 2010 until her death in 2011.  His brother was writer and producer Herb Sargent.

Sargent died from natural causes at his home in Seattle on May 9, 2019, four weeks after his 92nd birthday.

Filmography

Writer

Actor
From Here to Eternity (1953) - Nair (uncredited)

References

External links

1927 births
2019 deaths
American male screenwriters
American people of Russian-Jewish descent
Best Screenplay BAFTA Award winners
Best Adapted Screenplay Academy Award winners
Writers from Philadelphia
Writers Guild of America Award winners
Screenwriters from Pennsylvania
United States Navy personnel of World War II